A Key Habitat Site is a Canadian Wildlife Service designation for an area that supports at least 1% of the country's population of any migratory bird species, or subspecies, at any time. There may be overlap with areas designated as a migratory bird sanctuary or National Wildlife Area.

References

External links
 Key migratory bird terrestrial habitat sites in the Northwest Territories and Nunavut, March 2006

Canadian Wildlife Service
Environment and Climate Change Canada
Ornithology